Bicyclus auricruda, the small marbled bush brown, is a butterfly in the family Nymphalidae. It is found in Guinea, Liberia, Ivory Coast, Ghana, Nigeria, Cameroon, the Republic of the Congo, the Central African Republic, the Democratic Republic of the Congo, Uganda, Burundi, Kenya and Tanzania. The habitat consists of evergreen and gallery forests.

Subspecies
Bicyclus auricruda auricruda (Guinea, Liberia, Ivory Coast, Ghana)
Bicyclus auricruda fulgidus Fox, 1963 (Nigeria, Cameroon, Congo, Central African Republic, Democratic Republic of the Congo, Uganda, Burundi, western Kenya, western Tanzania)

References

Elymniini
Butterflies described in 1868
Butterflies of Africa
Taxa named by Arthur Gardiner Butler